The 2017 World RX of Germany was the eleventh round of the fourth season of the FIA World Rallycross Championship. The event was held at the Estering in Buxtehude, Lower Saxony.

Heats

Semi-finals
Semi-Final 1

Semi-Final 2

Final

Standings after the event

 Note: Only the top five positions are included.

References

External links

|- style="text-align:center"
|width="35%"|Previous race:2017 World RX of Latvia
|width="40%"|FIA World Rallycross Championship2017 season
|width="35%"|Next race:2017 World RX of South Africa
|- style="text-align:center"
|width="35%"|Previous race:2016 World RX of Germany
|width="40%"|World RX of Germany
|width="35%"|Next race:2018 World RX of Germany
|- style="text-align:center"

Germany
World RX
World RX
World RX